United States of Banana (2011) is a postmodern allegorical novel by the Puerto Rican author Giannina Braschi. It is a cross-genre work that blends experimental theatre, prose poetry, short story, and political philosophy with a manifesto on democracy and American life in a post-9/11 world. The book dramatizes the global war on terror and narrates the author's displacement after the attacks from her home in the Battery Park neighborhood in New York City. The work addresses Latin American immigration to the United States, Puerto Rico's colonial status, and "power imbalances within the Americas."

Summary

Part One: Ground Zero

Part One, titled as  "Ground Zero", critiques 21st-century capitalism and corporate censorship with its depictions of New York City before and during the September 11 attacks. Part One unfolds through a collection of metafiction, short stories, and philosophical essays on American culture since the attacks on the World Trade Center. Using avant-garde techniques, Braschi links post-9/11 fears of terrorism with the "daily suffering that stems from a changing, debt-ridden economy to offer a scathing critique of neoliberal economic and social reforms."

Part Two: United States of Banana
In Part Two, called "United States of Banana", the structure changes from political manifesto and philosophical fiction into an experimental theater play about economic terrorism, U.S. colonialism, liberty, and love.  Hamlet and Zarathustra (Zoroaster) join the author's alter-ego, Giannina, on a quest to liberate the Puerto Rican prisoner Segismundo (named after the protagonist of Pedro Calderón de la Barca's La vida es sueño) from the dungeon of the Statue of Liberty, where he has been held by his father, the king of the United States of Banana, for more than 100 years, for the crime of having been born. When the King remarries, he frees his son, and for the sake of reconciliation, makes Puerto Rico the fifty-first state and grants American passports to all Latin American citizens.

The play dramatizes the plight of prisoners in the United States, Puerto Rico's position as an American territory, and Braschi's struggle for liberty. By having the people of Puerto Rico vote on Segismundo's liberty, the work satirizes the three political options of Puerto Rico: statehood, nation, or colony. The prison scenes feature Middle Eastern prisoners of war, including those classified as terrorists, who are detained indefinitely.

According to Ronald Mendoza-de Jesús, "The plot of United States of Banana unfolds in the following way: Shakespeare’s Hamlet, Nietzsche’s Zarathustra, and a character named Giannina decide to cross the Hudson River to go to Liberty Island, penetrate the Statue of Liberty, and free Segismundo, subsequently freeing Puerto Rico from its colonial captivity. This act of defiance produces a response from Gertrude—Hamlet’s mother—who concocts a plan to marry Basilio, free Segismundo, and bring him into the same family as Hamlet as the only possible way to save the ancien régime of the imperial United States of Banana from collapsing. As part of her plan, Gertrude convinces Basilio that Puerto Rico should be granted admission into the United States of Banana, that all illegal immigrants should be granted citizenship, and that the borders of the United States of Banana should be opened. Her efforts to mitigate the revolution by granting concessions to Giannina and the other insurgents fail. Giannina and her comrades declare unilaterally the independence of Puerto Rico after realizing that the changes in the United States of Banana’s policies toward Puerto Rico and Latin America were an attempt to perpetuate a sort of imperial Pax Banana under the joint leadership of Basilio and Gertrude. War erupts between Puerto Rico, Cuba (which has claims to Puerto Rico and seeks to create its own Caribbean empire), and the United States of Banana. Giannina and her comrades can only rely on coconuts and philosophical conversation to fight the soldiers of the empire. But the timely intervention of China—the USB creditor—secures the independence of Puerto Rico and brings Braschi’s geopolitical comedy to a close."

Adaptations

American photographer Michael Somoroff directed and produced a series of short art films of the author's oral interpretation of the book; these films debuted at Cervantes Institute in New York on December 1, 2012.

In 2015, Colombian film and theater director Juan Pablo Felix adapted United States of Banana for the stage as a play of the same name. This production premiered at Schapiro Theater at Columbia University in New York City with soundtrack and music scored by Suzana Peric.
 In 2017, the novel was adapted into a graphic novel by Swedish cartoonist Joakim Lindengren.

Further reading 

Beck, Evelyn. Review of United States of Banana. Library Journal. (2011)
 Clarkson, Shaun. “Torching the Symbols of Liberty in United States of Banana.” Creative Sanctions: Imaginative Limits and the Post-9/11 Novel. Purdue University, 2017.
 Cruz-Malavé, Arnaldo Manuel. "Under the Skirt of Liberty: Giannina Braschi Rewrites Empire." American Quarterly 66.3. (2014)
 Daniele, Daniela. “Gamifying World Literature: Giannina Braschi’s United States of Banana (The Cartoon Art of September 11th).” Poets, Philosophers, Lovers: On the Writings of Giannina Braschi. University of Pittsburgh Press. (2020)
 Daniele, Daniela. “Review of United States of Banana: Apocalypse and Grand-Guignol” Evergreen Review. No. 128-129. (Spring 2012)
 Felix, Juan Pablo. “United States of Banana: A Postcolonial Dramatic Fiction Columbia University Academic Commons. (2015)
 Gonzalez, Madelena. “The Uncommon Wealth of Art: Poetic Progress as Resistance to the Commodification of Culture in United States of Banana.” Poets, Philosophers, Lovers: On the Writings of Giannina Braschi. University of Pittsburgh Press. (2020)
 Gonzalez, Madelena. "United States of Banana (2011), Elizabeth Costello (2003) and Fury (2001): Portrait of the Writer as the ‘Bad Subject’ of Globalisation." Études britanniques contemporaines. (2014) 
 Lara-Bonilla, Inmaculada. Review of Estados Unidos Banana. Chasqui: Reviews. (December 2018)
 Loingsigh, Aedin Ni. “Rewriting and Original Writing: Culture Clashes, Trauma and Emerging Discourses in Giannina Braschi's United States of Banana.” Rewriting in the 20th-21st Centuries: Aesthetic Choice or Political Act? Epinoux, Estelle and Nathatlie Martinière, eds. Paris: M. Houdiard. (2015)
 Lowry, Elizabeth. "The Human Barnyard: Rhetoric, Identification, and Symbolic Representation in Giannina Braschi’s United States of Banana." Representing 9/11: Trauma, Ideology, and Nationalism in Literature, Film, and Television. Petrovic, Paul, ed. Rowman & Littlefield. (2015)
 Mendoza-de Jesús, Ronald. “Free-dom: United States of Banana and the Limits of Sovereignty” (on Jacques Derrida and Giannina Braschi). Poets, Philosophers, Lovers: On the Writings of Giannina Braschi. University of Pittsburgh Press. (2020)
 Ramos, Francisco José. “The Holy Trinity: Money, Power, and Success in United States of Banana.” Poets, Philosophers, Lovers. University of Pittsburgh Press. (2020)
 Riofrio, John. "Falling for debt: Giannina Braschi, the Latinx Avant-garde, and Financial Terrorism in the United States of Banana." Latino Studies 18.1. (2020)
 Romero-Cesareo, Yvette and Lisa Paravisini-Gebert, eds. “New Book: Giannina Braschi’s United States of Banana.” Repeating Islands. (December 12, 2011)
 Smith, Amanda M. and Sheeran, Amy. Introduction. “United States of Banana, A Graphic Novel.” Joakim Lindengren and Giannina Braschi.” The Ohio State University Press. (2021)
 Waldron, John V. Review of Estados Unidos de Banana. Trad. Manuel Broncano. Feministas Unidas. (2018)

References

External links

Giannina Braschi National Book Festival (2012), Library of Congress Archives, Washington DC, 24 September 2012 
 Video by Michael Somoroff of Giannina Braschi reading United States of Banana, New York, November 2012

2011 American novels
Hispanic and Latino American novels
Metafictional novels
Novels set in New York City
Novels about democracy
Books about globalization
Books about capitalism
American novels adapted into plays
Novels adapted into comics
American novels adapted into films
Cultural depictions of Zoroaster
Literature by Hispanic and Latino American women
American philosophical novels
September 11 attacks in popular culture
Postmodern novels
Contemporary philosophical literature
Puerto Rican plays
Puerto Rican novelists
Postcolonial novels
Experimental theatre
Puerto Rican independence movement
American poetry books